Anselm Turmeda, later known as Abd-Allah at-Tarjuman (1355–1423), was a Christian priest from Mallorca who converted to Islam and settled in Tunis. He is one of the earliest writers to have written in both Arabic and a Latin language (Catalan). He became a vizier in Hafsid Tunis where he died in 1423 during the reign of Abu Faris Abd al-Aziz II.

Life 

Turmeda wrote that he studied and lived in Lleida. When approximately 35, he traveled to Sicily and stayed there for five months, after which he sailed to Tunis during the reign of Abu al-Abbas Ahmad II (r. 1370—1394), where he stayed with some Christian clergymen and traders for four months, during which time he asked to be connected to a Muslim who knows the "language of the Chrisitians", and was introduced to the court physician Yusuf, and announced to him that the reason he came to this land was because he intended to convert to Islam. Yusuf then introduced him to the Hafsid ruler, who inquired about his motives and authorized him to convert and offered him a salaried position.

Works
Llibre dels bons amonestaments

Turmeda dates it to April 1398, eleven years after his settlement in Tunis. It consists of 428 poems arranged in three rhyming stanzas followed by a rhyme-free one. Its preface says it was "composed in Tunis by monk Anselm Turmeda, also called Abdalà". The work was very popular in Catalonia, being called franselm (from "fra [i.e. friar] Anselm"). 

Disputa de l'ase

Written in 1417 in Catalan, no part survived in its original language. Current Catalan editions are available based on a medieval French translation. The Inquisition put it on the Index of prohibited books in 1583, contributing to its disappearance. Both for political and religious reasons, it did not square with the orthodoxy of Catholic Spain in the 16th century. It presents a dispute among a donkey and a friar, arguing about the supremacy of men over animals, each one defending their genre. Finally, men win because Christ was incarnated in a man. The work is, however, very critical towards mankind, in all the aspects: religious, moral, political, etc.

Llibre de tres

This book wants to instruct in an amusing way.

Tuhfat al-Arib fi al-Radd 'ala ahl al-Salib [English: The Gift to the Intelligent for Refuting the Arguments of the Christians]  (1420)

The best known of his Arabic books, it is a polemical work against Christianity and affirming the prophethood of the messenger of Allah, Muhammad. It had three editions in Arabic, three in Turkish, and one in Persian in a century (1873 to 1971). (Epalza)

References

External links 
 Page about Anselm Turmeda by the AELC, Association of Writers in Catalan Language. Page in Catalan, English and Spanish.
 Anselme Tourmède, Pourquoi j'ai embrassé l'islam, Perpignan, France: Éditions de la Merci, 2009. 
 
 Poems by Anselm Turmeda (Catalan)
  Esbozo comparativo del Pluralismo Pedagógico en Ramon Llull y Anselm Turmeda

Spanish Arabic-language writers
Writers from Catalonia
Exophonic writers
Medieval Catalan-language writers
Catalan-language poets
Translators from Arabic
Translators to Arabic
Translators from Catalan
Translators to Catalan
1355 births
1423 deaths
Converts to Islam
Converts to Islam from Roman Catholicism
Spanish Muslims
Majorcan writers
Spanish Franciscans
14th-century Aragonese Roman Catholic priests
14th-century people of Ifriqiya
15th-century people of Ifriqiya
Spanish emigrants to Tunisia